

Fossils
 Joshua Platt, a  curiosity dealer, continued prospecting for fossils in Stonesfield. He met with success, finding an incomplete Megalosaurus thigh bone, which he noted and illustrated. This bone was included in the 1773 catalogue of his large personal fossil collection.

References

18th century in paleontology
Paleontology